Cowon Systems, Inc. (simply known as Cowon) is a South Korean consumer electronics and software corporation. The company’s initial focus was software development and microelectronics, specializing in speech synthesis and speech recognition technology. In 2000, with the introduction of the iAUDIO CW100, Cowon expanded into the portable media player industry, which is now the core of their business.

In 2010, Cowon was ranked number one in the PMP category of Japanese Management Association Consultants’ Global Customer Satisfaction Competency Index, and in 2011, it was ranked number one in the same organization’s Global & Great Brand Competency Index.

In the west, Cowon is most well known for its iAUDIO range of portable media players, which has resulted in many people incorrectly referring to the company as “Cowon iAUDIO” or simply “iAUDIO.”  Outside the domestic market, Cowon iAUDIO's sales and market share have always been minuscule - however, it gained a certain niche market and retains a loyal following from fans and enthusiasts.

Products

In its marketing, Cowon distinguishes between "MP3 players" and "portable media players," where the latter are larger and have a greater focus on video playback. The categories differ slightly between the Korean and the global homepage.

All Cowon products are produced domestically in South Korea.

MP3 players
 Cowon M2 (2014)
 Cowon E3 (2014)
iAUDIO 9+ (2013)
Cowon D20 (2013)
Cowon X9 (2012)
iAUDIO 10 (2011)
Cowon C2 (2011)
Cowon X7 (2010)
Cowon J3 (2010)
iAUDIO E2 (2009)
iAUDIO 9 (2009)
Cowon S9 (2008)

LIAAIL products
Cowon’s LIAAIL division, founded in 2011, focuses on personal audio and cell phone accessories. Among its products can be found:
 Earphones
 Cowon BT2
Cowon EM1
Cowon EF1
Cowon XE1
Cowon CE1
Cowon SE2
Cowon EM2
 Cell phone cases
 Bird Case
 Tree Case
 Leather Case
 Jelly Case
 Cell phone screen protectors

Other products
 Cowon AD1, car camera released in 2012
 Cowon AC1, car camera released in 2012
 Cowon W2, Windows 7-based ultra-mobile PC released in 2010, available in 60 and 80 GB models
 Cowon W2 SSD, Windows 7-based ultra-mobile PC equipped with a solid state drive, released in 2010, available in a 32 GB model
 Cowon L3, GPS navigation device and in-car entertainment system released in 2009
 Cowon N3, GPS navigation device and in-car entertainment system released in 2007

Discontinued products
 Cowon D20
 Cowon iAUDIO 10
 Cowon C2
 Cowon D3 Plenue
 Cowon X7
 Cowon J3
 iAUDIO E2
 iAUDIO 9
 Cowon D2+
 Cowon S9
 Cowon D2
 Cowon iAUDIO 7

Portable media players
 Cowon G7
 Cowon T5
 Cowon Q7 Plenue
 Cowon A5 Plenue
 Cowon R7
 Cowon V5S
 Cowon 3D
 Cowon V5W
 Cowon V5
 Cowon O2
 Cowon iAUDIO X5
 Cowon A3
 Cowon A2

JetEffect
Each Cowon player is equipped with a set of software sound enhancement technologies collectively referred to as JetEffect. The latest version of JetEffect, JetEffect 5, was introduced with the release of the Cowon Z2 Plenue.

JetEffect competes with products such as Sony's DSEE, Samsung's DNSe, and the SRS technologies found in products by iriver and Samsung and in products by HTC and HP, where they are branded as "Beats Audio".

Features

In its latest iteration, JetEffect contains the following sound effects and enhancements:
 Five-band equalizer
 BBE+
 BBE+
 BBE Mach3Bass
 BBE 3D Surround
 BBE MP Enhance
 Special Effects
 Reverb
 Stereo Enhance

In JetAudio

History

 JetEffect 2.0
 JetEffect 3.0
 JetEffect 5

Software

Computer software

 JetAudio, media player application for Microsoft Windows first released in 1997
 JetVideo, video player application for Microsoft Windows with features which partially overlap with those of JetAudio. Like JetAudio, it relies on external codecs (such as those included in the K-Lite Codec Pack) for some of its data decoding.

Android apps
 JetAudio for Android
 JetVD
JetVD is an Android application for downloading videos from YouTube in a wide selection of formats. It was first introduced to users of the Cowon D3 Plenue with the upgrade to firmware version x.55. An online version of JetVD, called JetToy, exists in beta stage.

Other software
Other software developed by Cowon includes the iAUDIO LDB Manager, a small application for tagging music files with timecoded lyrics displayable on Cowon media players as well as in JetAudio.

Cowon also offers a number of freeware utilities, including JetCast, JetMailMonitor and JetToolBar. All of the above are available for free download from the JetAudio website.

Cowon’s ultra-mobile PCs W2 and W2 SSD come with JetToolbar pre-installed.

See also
 iAUDIO
JetEffect
JetAudio
List of Cowon products
 Cowon Z2 Plenue
 Cowon J3
 Cowon S9
 Cowon D2

References

External links

 COWONGLOBAL.com
 JetAudio (American homepage)
 LIAAIL idea & art 
 JetToy

Companies based in Seoul
Companies established in 1995
Consumer electronics brands
Audio equipment manufacturers of South Korea
Navigation system companies
Portable audio player manufacturers
Video surveillance companies
South Korean brands